Lionel K. Legge (1889-1970) was an associate justice of the South Carolina Supreme Court. He was the president of the Charleston County Bar starting in 1940. Justice Legge and his wife, Dorothy Haskell Porcher Legge, undertook the first restoration of Charleston's historic Rainbow Row homes in 1931 and made 99-101 East Bay Street their home. He is buried at St. Philip's Episcopal Church in Charleston, South Carolina.

References

Justices of the South Carolina Supreme Court
Lawyers from Charleston, South Carolina
1889 births
1970 deaths
20th-century American judges
20th-century American lawyers